Codex Parisinus Graecus 456, designated by siglum H, manuscript of Origen's Philocalia and Contra Celsum.

Description 

The manuscript contains text of Origen's Philocalia. It is very closely related to Codex Venetus Graecus 48, but not copied from it.

It contains also Arrian's Expeditio Alexandri immediately after the Philocalia. It contains also some iambics of the monk Bessarion on the death of Theodora.

History 

The manuscript was brought to Paris from Constantinople. Today it is housed at the Bibliothèque nationale de France (Gr. 456) in Paris.

References

Further reading 

 J. Armitage Robinson, The Philocalia of Origen: The text revised with a critical introduction and indices. Cambridge University Press/New York:Macmillan (1893), pp. XIII-XVIII
 Josep Rius-Camps, Orígenes Tractat dels principis, Barcelona 1998, pp. 19–20

External links 
 Origen: Manuscripts of the Philocalia

Bibliothèque nationale de France collections